The Castleford Tigers Women are a female rugby league club in Castleford, West Yorkshire, England, that competes in the Women's Super League, the top-level Women's rugby league club competition in the Northern Hemisphere. Nicknamed the Tigresses, the club formed in 2016 and participated as one of 3 teams in the inaugural season of the 2017 Women's Super League season, which then grew to 7 teams in 2018.

History

Formation
The Women's Team was formed in 2016 following discussions between local teachers Jonny Payne and Danny Holmes, who had set up girls teams for local amateur club Cutsyke Raiders, and Castleford Tigers Board Members Steve Gill and Richard Pell.

Debut season
In the debut season of the Women's Super League Castleford Tigers competed as one of 3 teams in the competition alongside Yorkshire rivals Bradford Bulls and Featherstone Rovers. The Tigers finished bottom of the inaugural competition winning only one of their six games.

2018 season
With a larger number of teams joining the competition, 2018 saw Castleford compete as one of 7 teams in the Women's Super League, alongside Bradford, Featherstone and newcomers York City Knights, Wigan Warriors, St. Helens and Leeds Rhinos. Widnes Vikings had harboured hopes of joining the competition but pulled out before the season started. 

Castleford kicked off the season with a 62-0 thrashing over York and have gone on to win 4 of their 7 games, along with 2 draws and 1 loss. On 4 August, they played Leeds Rhinos in the Women's Challenge Cup Final at the Halliwell Jones Stadium, Warrington. Castleford led 14-6 at half-time but eventually succumbed to 20-14 defeat, finishing as runners-up.

2019 season
The Tigresses kicked off the 2019 season with a 78-0 hammering against York City Knights before going on to win their first seven Super League games remaining as the only unbeaten side in the competition to date. In terms of their Challenge Cup (Rugby League) exploits, the side beat local rivals Featherstone Rovers, Bradford Bulls and also a 100-0 destruction of local rivals Wakefield Trinity, a record in Women's rugby league, en route to a second successive Challenge Cup Final. The final will be played at the University of Bolton Stadium on 27 July, as part of a triple-header of games with the men's Challenge Cup Semi Finals. The Tigresses also broke the record attendance for a Women's game with a crowd of 1,492 at their Quarter Final tie against Bradford

2020 season
The Tigresses were ready to kick off the 2020 season with the intentions of putting the losses of the finals in 2019 behind them, but due to Covid 19 the season never got started as the year went on the announcement of Claire Garner retiring from the sport, The England international will be miss by al at the Tigers, Meg Birch also has stepped away from rugby after the birth of her second child.

Stadium

The Jungle 
Castleford Tigers Women currently play their home games at Wheldon Road, home of Castleford Tigers

Playing Squad 2023

Seasons

Honours

Leagues
Women's Super League

League Leaders Shield
Winners (1): 2019

Cups
Women's Challenge Cup
Winners (0): 
Runners up (1): 2018
HerRL Trophy
Winners (1): 2019

References

External links

 
2016 establishments in England
Rugby clubs established in 2016
Women's rugby league teams in England
Rugby league teams in West Yorkshire
RFL Women's Super League